2009 Malta Open is a darts tournament, which took place in Malta in 2009.

Results

References

2009 in darts
2009 in Maltese sport
Darts in Malta